Kolasareh (also Romanized as Kolāsareh) is a village in Kuhsarat Rural District, in the Central District of Minudasht County, Golestan Province, Iran. At the 2006 census, its population was 1,341, in 275 families.

References 

Populated places in Minudasht County